Mwoakilloa (or Mokil previously named Wellington Island or Duperrey Island, after Louis Isidore Duperrey) is an inhabited atoll in the central Pacific Ocean.  Geographically, it belongs to the Caroline Islands and is a district of the outlying islands of Pohnpei of the Federated States of Micronesia.

Mwoakilloa lies 153 kilometres east of Pohnpei and approximately 113 kilometres northwest of Pingelap.  The almost-rectangular atoll is 4.5 kilometres long and 2.8 kilometres broad.  The atoll consists of the three islands Uhrek, Kahlap (Capitol), and Mwandohn, forming a central lagoon of approximately 2 square kilometres in area.  Only the northeast island Kahlap is inhabited, with the town facing the lagoon.  The total area of all islands is approximately 1.24 square kilometres.

The population of Mwoakilloa decreased from 177 in 2000 to 147 in 2008.  The inhabitants speak Mokilese — similar to the Pohnpeian language in the family of Micronesian languages.

The name "Wellington Island" comes from the vessel Marquis of Wellington, whose captain named the island after his vessel. The Marquis of Wellington was on her way to China, having transported 200 or so convicts to Port Jackson, Australia, from Britain.

Transportation

Mokil Airfield is located on the southern end of Kahlap with a  runway. The airfield offers no service and used by chartered flights by Caroline Islands Air.

References

External links 

 
 Mokil in the German Colonial Lexicon (German)
 A map of the Mokil atoll

Atolls of the Federated States of Micronesia
Islands of Pohnpei